Lithium nitrate is an inorganic compound with the formula LiNO3. It is the lithium salt of nitric acid (an alkali metal nitrate). The salt is deliquescent, absorbing water to form the hydrated form, lithium nitrate trihydrate.  Its eutectics are of interest for heat transfer fluids.

It is made by treating lithium carbonate or lithium hydroxide with nitric acid.

Uses
This deliquescent colourless salt is an oxidizing agent used in the manufacture of red-colored fireworks and flares.

Thermal storage
The hydrated form, lithium nitrate trihydrate, has an extremely high specific heat of fusion, and hence can be used for thermal energy storage at its melt temperature of 303.3 K.

Lithium nitrate has been proposed as a medium to store heat collected from the sun for cooking. A Fresnel lens would be used to melt solid lithium nitrate, which would then function as a "solar battery", allowing heat to be redistributed later by convection.

Synthesis
Lithium nitrate can be synthesized by reacting nitric acid and lithium carbonate.
Li2CO3 + 2 HNO3 → 2 LiNO3 + H2O + CO2

Generally when forming LiNO3, a pH indicator is used to determine when all of the acid has been neutralized. However, this neutralization can also be recognized with the loss of carbon dioxide production. In order to rid the final product of excess water, the sample is heated.

Toxicity
Lithium nitrate can be toxic to the body when ingested by targeting the central nervous system, thyroids, kidneys, and cardio-vascular system. 
When exposed to the skin, eyes, and mucous membranes, lithium nitrate can cause irritation to these areas.

Further reading

References

External links
Hazardous Chemical Database

Nitrates
Lithium salts
Deliquescent substances
Pyrotechnic oxidizers
Pyrotechnic colorants
Oxidizing agents